Nasser al-Ghannam (Arabic: ناصر الغنام) is an Iraqi military leader. He served as major general with the Iraqi special forces.

Early life
Nasser bin Ahmed bin Ghannam was born in the city of Hit in 1374 AH, to the parents of Iraqi Arabs belonging to the family of the well-known Al-Ghannam branch of Al-Shaya in Akil Arab.

Military service
He graduated from military college 1. After graduation he completed special forces and underwater training. He worked in special forces regiments and then in the military college. He completed the leadership course and the Staff College and graduated with the rank of captain.

He became a corner officer in Armored Brigade 41, served as a Republican guard and a lieutenant in the 3rd Brigade. He served Special Forces Republican Guard and Assistant Regiment Commander in the 26th Brigade of the Republican Guards and then an Order of the Republican Guards.

He supervised the building of the liberation from Al Qaeda and then became commander of the 2nd division in Mosul for two years. He served as commander of the 17th division south of Baghdad for two years and established stable security.

He completed two degrees of military science with the second on international business administration.

On 18 October 2014 he started working at the Ministry of Defense and on 7 April 2015 was assigned to the post of commander of the operations of the island and the desert to liberate Anbar province.

References

1960 births
Living people
Iraqi Ground Forces officers
Iraqi Shia Muslims
Iraqi military leaders
Iraqi generals